Maa Tara Chandi Temple is a Hindu temple dedicated to Maa Shakti or Maa Durga, located in Sasaram, Bihar, India. It is one of the 51 Shakti Peetha.

History
Maa Tarachandi Shakti Peetha, also called Maa Tarachandi, is the oldest and one of the most sacred temples of Sasaram. It is regarded as one of the 51 Siddha Shakti Pithas in India. According to Pauranic legends, the "right eye" (Netra) of the corpse of Sati had fallen here when it was chopped off by Lord Vishnu with his "Sudarshan Chakra". The ancient temple, originally called Maa Sati, is believed to be the abode of the goddess Durga Maa Tara Chandi.

The Kaimur Hills provide an access to many other attractions of Sasaram like Gupta Mahadev Temple, Parvati Temple, ancient caves,  Manjhar Kund and Dhua Kund are two waterfalls of this town that have the capacity of generating large amounts of electricity.

Ancient
The right eye (netra) of Maa Sati is believed to have dropped here, so the name Tarachandi. It is also said that when Gautama Buddha came here after getting enlightenment, Maa Tarachandi had given him darshan in the form of a girl child. then he was directed to go to Sarnath, where Buddha had preached for the very first time. Known to give moksha, the mode of worship is satvik. It is said that Goddess Lakshmi showers those with prosperity who pray here.

Shakti Peetha
The Shakti Peetha (Sanskrit: शक्ति पीठ, Śakti Pīṭha, seat of Shakti is a place of worship consecrated ashes of the goddess Shakti or Sati, the female principal of Hinduism and the main deity of the Shakta sect. They are sprinkled throughout the Indian subcontinent.

Rituals
 Nitya Puja
 Shriangar
 Aarti 
 Bhog (Halwa puri)
 Shayana Aarti

Location

Hindus in large number assemble to worship the goddess.

See also

Mundeshwari Temple
Daksha
Shiva

References

External links 

Hindu temples in Bihar
Shakti temples
Hindu temples in Rohtas district